Ignacio María González (January 26, 1838February 8, 1915) was a politician from the Dominican Republic. He served as 14th president of the Dominican Republic at various times throughout his career.

References

Biography at the Enciclopedia Virtual Dominicana

|-

|-

1838 births
1915 deaths
People from Santo Domingo
Dominican Republic people of Spanish descent
Presidents of the Dominican Republic